3642 Frieden, provisional designation , is a carbonaceous asteroid from the middle region of the asteroid belt, approximately 35 kilometers in diameter. It was discovered by German astronomer Herta Gessner at Sonneberg Observatory on 4 December 1953. It is named after the goddess of peace, Pax.

Orbit and classification 

Frieden orbits the Sun in the central main-belt at a distance of 2.6–3.0 AU once every 4 years and 8 months (1,700 days). Its orbit has an eccentricity of 0.08 and an inclination of 13° with respect to the ecliptic. The body was first identified as "1908 ED" at the U.S Taunton Observatory in 1908, while its first used observation was made at the Belgian Uccle Observatory 1936, extending the asteroid's observation arc by 17 years prior to its official discovery.

Physical characteristics 

In the SMASS classification, Frieden is a carbonaceous C-type asteroid.

Diameter and albedo 

According to the surveys carried out by the Infrared Astronomical Satellite IRAS, the Japanese Akari satellite, and NASA's Wide-field Infrared Survey Explorer with its subsequent NEOWISE mission, Frieden measures between 31.9 and 36.0 kilometers in diameter and its surface has an albedo between 0.046 and 0.071. The Collaborative Asteroid Lightcurve Link derives an albedo of 0.047 and a diameter of 35.1 kilometers, based on an absolute magnitude of 11.2.  Between 2019 and 2021, 3642 Frieden has been observed to occult four stars.

Rotation period 

In April 2006, a rotational lightcurve of Frieden was obtained from photometric observations by American astronomer Brian Warner at his Palmer Divide Observatory, Colorado. It gave a well-defined rotation period of  hours with a brightness variation of  magnitude.

Naming 

This minor planet was named after the German translation of the goddess Pax in the hope for peace around the world. The official naming citation was published by the Minor Planet Center on 2 February 1988.

References

External links 
 Lightcurve plot of 3642 Frieden, Palmer Divide Observatory, B. D. Warner (2006)
 Asteroid Lightcurve Database (LCDB), query form (info )
 Dictionary of Minor Planet Names, Google books
 Asteroids and comets rotation curves, CdR – Observatoire de Genève, Raoul Behrend
 Discovery Circumstances: Numbered Minor Planets (1)-(5000) – Minor Planet Center
 
 

003642
Named minor planets
003642
19531204